Louis LaCoss (January 8, 1890 – February 17, 1966) was an American journalist. In 1952, he was awarded the Pulitzer Prize for Editorial Writing for his editorial "The Low Estate of Public Morals".

After graduating from the University of Kansas in 1912 he went on to work for the San Diego Sun, the Parsons Sun, and the Associated Press. In 1923 he left the AP for the St. Louis Globe-Democrat, the paper for which he would be best known. He won the 1952 Pulitzer Prize for Editorial Writing for the editorial "Low Estate of Public Morals". He had been writing editorials for the paper for 16 year before this win. The article related to a cheating scandal at West Point to general morality of the society and it received many requests for reprint. Louis LaCoss became one of the papers vice-presidents in 1952 and then retired from editorials in 1958.

References

1890 births
1966 deaths
American male journalists
Pulitzer Prize for Editorial Writing winners
University of Kansas alumni
Writers from Erie, Pennsylvania
St. Louis Globe-Democrat people
Journalists from Pennsylvania
20th-century American journalists